Joachim Albertini or Gioacchino Albertini (30 November 1748, Pesaro27 March 1812, Warsaw) was an Italian-born composer, who spent most of his life in Poland. His opera  (Don Giovanni or The Libertine Penalized) was performed in the 1780s with both Italian and Polish libretti.

Works

Stage
 La cacciatrice brillante, intermezzo, libretto by G. Mancinelli, Rome, Teatro di Tordinona, February 1772
 Przyjazd pana, polish comedy, Warsaw, 1781
 Don Juan albo Ukarany libertyn (Don Juan, or The Libertine Punished), opera in three acts, libretto by Giovanni Bertati, translation by Wojciech Bogusławski, Warsaw, 23 February 1783
 Virginia, opera seria, libretto by Luigi Romanelli, Rome, Teatro delle Dame, 7 January 1786 (Italian libretto)
 Scipione Africano, opera seria, libretto by Nicolò Minato, Rome, 1789
 La vergine vestale, opera seria, libretto by Michelangelo Prunetti, Rome, Teatro delle Dame, 2 January 1803 (Italian libretto)
 Kapelmajster polski (The Polish Kapellmeister), intermezzo in one act, libretto by L. A. Dmuszewski, Warsaw, 28 October 1808

Other works
 Missa solemnis, 28 August 1782
 Offertorium
 Kantata na rocznicę elekeji Króla (Cantata on the Anniversary of the King’s Election), 7 September 1790
 Symphony in D, 1791
 Septet, 25 April 1806

References

Bibliography
 Barbara Chmara-Żaczkiewicz, "Albertini, Gioacchino", The New Grove Dictionary of Music and Musicians, Second Edition (London: Macmillan, 2001). .

External links
 

1748 births
1812 deaths
Italian opera composers
Male opera composers
Polish opera composers